The Belarusian Popular Front "Revival" (BPF, ; Biełaruski Narodny Front "Adradžeńnie", BNF) was a social and political movement in Belarus in the late 1980s and 1990s which led Belarus to its independence from the Soviet Union. It was similar to the Popular Fronts of Latvia and Estonia, and the Sąjūdis movement in Lithuania.

Creation
The Belarusian Popular Front was established in 1989, following the examples of the Popular Fronts in the Baltic states. Its founding conference had to be organized in Vilnius because of pressure from the authorities of the Byelorussian SSR.

Initially, the Popular Front united numerous minor organizations promoting the Belarusian language and history. However, soon the movement began voicing political demands, supporting the Perestroika and democratization in the Soviet Union which would enable a Belarusian national revival. The Popular Front was the first political organization in Belarus to openly oppose the Communist Party of Byelorussia.

The prominent Belarusian writer Vasil Bykaŭ became an active member of the Belarusian Popular Front. Writer Aleś Adamovič was an active supporter of the Popular Front.

The Front had about 10 thousand activists in different regions of Belarus as well as in Moscow, Vilnius and Riga. It published a newspaper, Навіны БНФ "Адраджэньне" (News of the Belarusian Popular Front "Revival").

Among the significant achievements of the Front was the uncovering of the burial site of Kurapaty near Minsk, a major NKVD mass extermination site of Soviet political prisoners in the 1930s.

The Belarusian Popular Front actively protested against Soviet policies following the Chernobyl accident, after which a large territory of Belarus was contaminated by nuclear fallout.

In the parliament of Belarus
In May 1990, 37 members of the Belarusian Popular Front were elected into the 12th Belarusian Supreme Council and formed a dynamic opposition group in the parliament of the then Soviet-controlled Byelorussian Soviet Socialist Republic.

In July 1990, the Belarusian Popular Front initiated the passing of the Declaration of State Sovereignty of the Byelorussian Soviet Socialist Republic. In August 1991, following the 1991 Soviet coup d'état attempt and supported by tens of thousands of protesters outside the parliament building, the Belarusian Popular Front managed to convince the Supreme Soviet to declare full independence of Belarus from the USSR. The historical Belarusian national symbols: the white-red-white flag and the Pahonia coat of arms were restored as state symbols of Belarus.

Opposition to the regime of Alexander Lukashenko
In 1994, Alexander Lukashenko was elected president of Belarus. From the very beginning, the Belarusian Popular Front became one of the main political forces opposing president Lukashenko. In 1994 the BPF formed a shadow cabinet consisting of 100 BPF intellectuals.

In 1995, members of parliament from the Belarusian Popular Front went on a hunger strike as a protest against Lukashenko's controversial referendum to replace state symbols with slightly amended Soviet ones and to make Russian language official in Belarus. The hunger strike was violently interrupted by police forces who beat up the members of parliament.

In 1996, the Belarusian Popular Front was one of the main powers behind mass protests against Lukashenko's policies of Russification and integration with Russia, as well as against his second controversial referendum amending the constitution in a way to concentrate power in the president's hands. The protests were violently dispersed by the police. Two leaders of the Belarusian Popular Front, Zianon Pazniak and Siarhiej Navumčyk, have fled the country and received political asylum in the United States.

Split
In 1999, the Belarusian Popular Front split into two rival organizations. Its conservative wing under the exiled leader Zianon Pazniak formed the Conservative Christian Party – BPF (Kanservatyŭna-Chryścijanskaja Partyja BNF), while the moderate majority formed the BPF Party (Partyja BNF, Партыя БНФ) led by Vincuk Viačorka.

Both parties claim to be the only legitimate successor of the Belarusian Popular Front established in 1989. The Malady Front, formerly the Popular Front's youth group, has also become an autonomous organization.

In 2011, following an internal conflict, more than 90 further members left BPF Party, including several prominent veterans of the original Belarusian Popular Front, such as Lavon Barščevski, Jury Chadyka, Vincuk Viačorka. This was described by some as a "second split" of the Belarusian Popular Front.

Formally, the Belarusian Popular Front continues to exist as an NGO affiliated with the BPF Party.

Notable former members
 Vasil Bykaŭ, writer, Nobel prize nominee
 Ryhor Baradulin, poet and writer, Nobel prize nominee
 Siarhiej Navumčyk, vice president of the Rada of the Belarusian Democratic Republic in Exile
 Aleś Bialacki, human rights activist and political prisoner
 Piatro Sadoŭski, Belarus' first ambassador to Germany
 Pavał Sieviaryniec, Christian Democratic politician and political prisoner
 Jaŭhien Kulik, graphic designer, author of the Coat of arms of Belarus adopted in 1991
 Uładzimier Arłoŭ, writer
 Jaŭhien Šatochin, artist

See also
 People's Movement of Ukraine
 Popular Front of Latvia
 Popular Front of Estonia
 Sąjūdis

References

External links
 The Belarusian Popular Front in 1988—1996: photo and video
  НАРОДНЫ ФРОНТ. Фотагісторыя змаганьня і перамогі (The People's Front. Photo-history of struggle and victory)

1989 establishments in the Soviet Union
Political history of Belarus
Byelorussian Soviet Socialist Republic
Anti-communism in Belarus
Independence movements
Dissolution of the Soviet Union
Popular fronts in the Soviet Union
Belarusian independence movement
Political parties established in 1989